Procardium is a genus of bivalves belonging to the subfamily Cardiinae of the family Cardiidae.

Species
 † Procardium avisanense (Fontannes, 1879)
 † Procardium danubianum (Mayer, 1866) 
 † Procardium diluvianum (Lamarck, 1819) 
 Procardium indicum (Lamarck, 1819)
 † Procardium jansseni ter Poorten & La Perna, 2017 
 † Procardium kunstleri (Cossmann & Peyrot, 1912) 
 † Procardium magnei ter Poorten & La Perna, 2017

References

External links
  Poorten, J. J. ter; La Perna, R. (2017). The West African enigma: Systematics, evolution, and palaeobiogeography of cardiid bivalve Procardium. Acta Palaeontologica Polonica. 62 (4): 729–757

Cardiidae
Bivalve genera